"Narcotic" is a song by German duo YouNotUs, Dutch singer and songwriter Janieck and Senex from German alternative rock band Liquido. The song is a remix of Liquido's 1998 song of the same name. It was released through Raison Music Records, which is exclusively-licensed to B1 Recordings, a division of Sony Music, on 26 April 2019. The official music video was released on 14 June 2019.

Background 
YouNotUs made the song to celebrate the 20th anniversary of the original song released in 1998. Wolfgang Schrödl, alias Senex, affirmed that when he wrote the song in the late nineties, he did not think it would become a classic one day. YouNotUs said, "We wanted to offer a distraction from everyday life; a world into which our listeners can dream". The German duo confessed to Der Westen editors the genesis of the song. Tobias Bodgon from the duo said that they shared with Wolfgang [Schrödl] a studio complex in Berlin-Kreuzberg. Gregor Sahm, the other member of the duo added, "Actually Wolfgang never wanted to release a cover. But then I worked on it at the Echo aftershow party until he agreed. [...] We wanted to rekindle the song. We wanted to make him recognizable, but give him a new facet. The sweet melancholy that he has in the original, we wanted to give a summery touch." In the studio, Wolfgang Schrödl recorded guitars himself, brought back the old synth of the 90's and sang the C-part, which is an intermediate part with harmonically or rhythmically new parts.

Critical reception 
Jazzie of Koeln-News wrote that "YouNotUs transformed the rocking original into a bouncing dance-pop track with great attention to detail, from tunes as soft as a southern sea breeze, to the sunny tropical vibe, to the euphoric drops".
Dance-Charts noted that the original version is hard to recognize. They remarked the presence of "guitars, piano chords and airy percussion [in the remake] with the vocals of Janieck". To conclude, they wrote that the three artists "have transformed the rock classic into a bouncing dance-pop track with tropical vibes".

Track listing

Credits and personnel 
Credits adapted from Tidal.

 Gregor Sahm – production, composition
 Tobias Bogdon – production, composition
 Janieck Van De Polder – composition, lyrics
 Wolfgang Schrödl – composition, lyrics
 Lex Barkey – master engineering, mix engineering

Charts

Weekly charts

Year-end charts

Certifications

References 

2019 songs
2019 singles
German dance-pop songs
German dance songs
German pop songs
Songs written by Janieck Devy